Monika Sommer is a retired East German rower who won four medals at European championships between 1962 and 1967, including a gold medal in double sculls in 1966, together with Ursula Pankraths.

References 

Living people
East German female rowers
Year of birth missing (living people)